(born April 7, 1964) is a Japanese suit actor.

Partial filmography
"Godzilla vs. King Ghidorah" (1991) as Godzillasaurus
 Godzilla vs. Mechagodzilla II (1993) as Mechagodzilla/Super Mechagodzilla
 Yamato Takeru (1994) as Utuno Ikusa Gami
 Godzilla vs. SpaceGodzilla (1994) as MOGUERA
 Chouseishin Gransazer (2003/2004) as Sazer-Remls
 Genseishin Justirisers (2004/2005) as Riser Gant
 Chousei Kantai Sazer-X (2005/2006) as Captain Shark

References

Japanese male film actors
1964 births
People from Osaka Prefecture
Living people